A list of CDMA2000 networks worldwide.

Active networks

Defunct networks

See also 
 List of mobile network operators
 CDMA frequency bands
 List of 5G NR networks
 List of LTE networks
 List of UMTS networks

References 

Code division multiple access
Lists by country
Telecommunications lists